Cimex pilosellus, known generally as the bat bug or western bat bug, is a species of bed bug in the family Cimicidae. It is found in North America.

References

Further reading

 

Cimicidae
Articles created by Qbugbot
Insects described in 1910